Folke Johansson Ängel (Latin: Fulco Angelus) (died 1277) was Archbishop of Uppsala.

Biography
He was ordained by  Pope Gregory X in 1274 and was Archbishop of Uppsala until his death in 1277. As archbishop, he crowned King Magnus Ladulås in 1276.
Archbishop Ängel is best known for commissioning the moving of the episcopal see from its location in what is now known as Old Uppsala to Östra Aros   in Uppsala. Archbishop Ängel was buried in Uppsala Cathedral, which started to be constructed in 1272, as a part of the project of the episcopal see.

See also 
 List of Archbishops of Uppsala

References 

 Nordisk familjebok, article Ängel In Swedish

Related reading
Åsbrink, Gustav & Westman, Knut B. Svea rikes ärkebiskopar från 1164 till nuvarande tid (Bokförlaget Natur och Kultur, Stockholm 1935)
 

Roman Catholic archbishops of Uppsala
13th-century births
1277 deaths
13th-century Swedish people